Rantsila (also ) is a village and former municipality of Finland.

It is located in the province of Oulu and is part of the Northern Ostrobothnia region. The municipality was unilingually Finnish.

During the Finnish War (1808–1809), which resulted in Finland being ceded to the Russian Empire, the last battle engaged within Finland was held in the Kerälä village of Rantsila, between the Russian and Swedish-Finnish armies. General J.A. Sandels was perhaps the most highly respected commander of the Finnish troops, and in honour of him and his noble and highly renowned horse Bijou, an equestrian statue was erected in the center of Rantsila in 1989.

The municipality was consolidated with Kestilä, Piippola and Pulkkila on 1 January 2009 to form a new municipality of Siikalatva.

Rantsila is famous for its heavy metal bands such as Hater, Hamarapuoli and Kolera, as well as internet personality Ari Kivikangas, better known as Cyberman.

References

External links 

 Municipality of Rantsila – official site 

Former municipalities of Finland
Populated places established in 1867
Populated places disestablished in 2009
2009 disestablishments in Finland
Siikalatva